AI21 Labs is a Tel Aviv-based company specializing in Natural Language Processing (NLP), which develops AI systems that can understand and generate natural language. AI21 Labs is often mentioned by the big media like TechCrunch, The New York Times, Tthe Times of Israel and VentureBeat as a rival to OpenAI.

History 
AI21 Labs was founded in November 2017 by Yoav Shoham, Ori Goshen, Amnon Shashua in Tel Aviv, Israel. 

In January 2019, the company raised $9.5 million from investors in a seed funding round. On October 27, 2020, AI21 Labs launched the first product, Wordtune, an AI-based writing app that understands context and meaning. Google named Wordtune one of its favorite extensions of 2021. In August , 2021, the company launched AI21 Studio. In the same month, Jurassic-1, a natural language processing system, was launched with a token vocabulary over 250,000.

In November 2021,  Walden Catalyst invested in A21 Labs $20 million. Later that month AI21 Labs completed a $25 million series A round led by Pitango First. In July 2022, the company raised $64 million in a series B funding round led by Ahren with the participation of prof. Amnon Shashua, Walden Catalyst, Pitango, TPY Capital, and Mark Leslie.

On January 17, 2023, AI21 Labs announced the launch of Wordtune Spices, that generates a range of text options that can enhance sentences.

See also 

 ChatGPT
 OpenAI

References 

Companies of Israel